A seahorse is a marine fish belonging to the genus Hippocampus.

Seahorse or seahorses may also refer to:

Science and technology
 Hippopotamus, which was often called a seahorse in the mid-nineteenth century
 Seahorse (software), a GPG front-end application for GNOME

Arts and entertainment
 The Seahorses, a British rock band
 The Sea Horse, a 1974 off-Broadway play by Edward J. Moore; see Royal Manitoba Theatre Centre production history
 "Seahorses", an episode of the television series Teletubbies
 Sea Horse Baian, a fictional character in the manga Saint Seiya (aka Knights of the Zodiac)

Military
 USS Seahorse, several United States Navy ships
 HMS Seahorse, several Royal Navy ships
 F. F. E. Yeo-Thomas (1902–1964), S.O.E. operative had "SEAHORSE" as a code name during World War II
 Seahorse, various versions of the Sikorsky H-34 military helicopter
 Sea Horse, a merchant ship in the wrecking of the Sea Horse, Boadicea and Lord Melville in 1816

Transport
 Seahorse (HBC vessel, 1734), operated by the HBC from 1734-1764, see Hudson's Bay Company vessels
 Seahorse (HBC vessel, 1765), operated by the HBC from 1765-1781, see Hudson's Bay Company vessels
 Seahorse (HBC vessel, 1782), operated by the HBC from 1782-1792, see Hudson's Bay Company vessels

Other uses
 Hippocampus (mythology) or sea-horse, a mythological creature depicted as a horse in its forepart with a fish-like hindquarter
 Sea Horse (restaurant), a restaurant in Helsinki, Finland
 King George V Seahorses, a set of British postage stamps

See also
 Walrus
 Battle of Mount Austen, the Galloping Horse, and the Sea Horse, an engagement between United States and Imperial Japanese forces
 Water horse, any of several mythical creatures